Hinduism is the majority religion in Delhi, India. According to the 2011 Census of India, the National Capital Territory of Delhi has 13,712,100 Hindus, who form 81.68% of the population. Hinduism can be extensively seen in culture and history of Delhi and was established by Hindu Tomara king, Anangpala. Though, the Hindus have seen some decline in the Delhi Sultanate and Mughal Empire, due to conversions and persecution. Delhi is also home to many Hindu temple and ashrams. There are more than 590 registered temples in Delhi, out of which Kalka, Birla, Akshardham and ISKCON Temple are the most visited.

History

Early history 
Hinduism is believed to have been present in Delhi from prehistoric times, during the times of Pandavas when it was their capital by the name of Indraprastha and was under the control of Kuru Kingdom.

Demographics

Population by District

Population by sub-district

Communities 
In local and ruler Delhi, the Gurjar, Jats, Rajput, Brahmin and other Dalit communities have been residing in Delhi from long times. After Partition, many Sindhis (mainly Hindus) from Pakistan came and settled in New Delhi. Due to Urbanization of New Delhi many people of Bihar, Uttarakhandis and other neighbouring regions came to settle in Delhi.

References

Citations

Bibliography

External links